Kuo Nan-hung (23 October 1936 – 1 January 2023) was a Taiwanese politician who served as Minister of Transportation and Communications from 1987 to 1990.

Biography
Originally an electronical engineer, Guo Nanhong became the President of the National Chiao Tung University in 1979 and served in that position until 1987, when he was appointed to the Executive Yuan under President of the Republic of China Chiang Ching-kuo.

He later served as a Councilor of the Executive Yuan from 1990 to 1993 and then as the Minister of the National Science and Technology Council from 1993 till 1996, when he resigned to rejoin the National Chiao Tung University.

Nanhong died from COVID-19 on 1 January 2023, at the age of 86.

References

1936 births
2023 deaths
Taiwanese Ministers of Transportation and Communications
Presidents of universities and colleges in Taiwan
Politicians from Taipei
Northwestern University alumni
Academic staff of the National Chiao Tung University
Deaths from the COVID-19 pandemic in Taiwan